Tamphana marmorea is a moth in the Bombycidae family. It was described by Schaus in 1892. It is found in Costa Rica and Brazil.

References

Bombycidae
Moths described in 1892